Enterprise performance management (EPM) is a field of business performance management which considers the visibility of operations in a closed-loop model across all facets of the enterprise.  Specific to financial activities in the office of the chief financial officer, EPM also supports financial planning and analysis (FP&A). Corporate performance management (CPM) is a synonym for enterprise performance management. Gartner has officially retired the concept of CPM and reclassified it into "financial planning and analysis (FP&A)" and "financial close" to reflect two significant trendsincreased focus on planning and the emergence of a new category of solutions supporting the management of the financial close.

Several domains in the EPM field are driven by corporate initiatives, academic research, and commercial approaches. These include:
 Strategy formulation
 Business planning and forecasting
 Financial management
 Supply chain effectiveness
Based on the mission and vision of an organization, different strategic needs may drive how EPM domains are leveraged and promoted within an organization. For example, a professional services firm based in Canada may view the need to have effective and transparent supply chain operations very differently from a clothing manufacturer with operations throughout the world. What is common in the EPM approach is the closed-loop EPM process model advocated by Kaplan and Norton and their management approaches to strategy formulation, including balanced scorecard and strategy map techniques.

The four domains, or disciplines, referred to above exist to define and cover the six stages of the closed-loop EPM process model. The six stages of the closed-loop EPM process model are strategy development, translation, organization alignment, operations planning, learning and monitoring, and testing and adaptation.

Strategy formulation
Strategy formulation refers to an organization's activities that determine its agenda's direction. This is generally constructed of an organization's mission, vision, and strategic goals and objectives. Once the direction is established, an organization monitors its progress against those activities and takes corrective actions to reach a particular target state.

While execution is the key to any operational objective, the strategy formulation surrounding why execution should occur and the context by which execution should be performed is also important. In recent years, organizations embed formal approaches to risk management to address market opportunities that organizations pursue. In this way, strategy is aligned, performance is predictable, and executives can make better business decisions.

Executives live in a financially driven environment, where operational processes are traditionally a means of organizing resources inside the company and its value chain and employees are the responsible actors to execute those processes. The strategy gap that some industry watchdogs have noted is real and growing. Innovative technologies provide one approach to collapsing this gap and allowing corporate strategic outcomes to be fully realized and risk management programs to be fully described.

The first two steps of the closed-loop EPM process model involve developing the strategy and then to translate the strategy into particular actions that the organization can undertake. Strategy development as a subset of strategy formulation represents the articulation of the key components of strategy: mission, vision, strategic goals, and strategic objectives. There are several approaches to strategy development which may be considered. However, this may occur the executive leadership of the organization approve the strategy and typically review this strategy every 3–5 years based upon a 10–20-year time horizon. Some business and national cultures may consider a longer-range strategy time horizon.

Strategy translation then takes the often-obscure direction and statements defined in the first step and considers how to make these directions actionable. In the case of strategic goals, these are lofty targets given generally 3–5 years to achieve. Strategic objectives then identify specific progress against goals in a given time period. For example, "product ABC will achieve a market share of x% over the next two fiscal years" would be a strategic objective. Key performance indicators assigned to these goals are determined which can monitor the organization progress towards achieving goals and objectives.

Business planning and forecasting
Business planning and forecasting refers to the set of activities where business is planned against the strategy and what forecast activities or results of the organization may occur from operational execution during a particular time period. This discipline corresponds to the third and sixth steps of the closed-loop EPM process model. Financial forecasts are a forecast of how a business will perform financially over, say, the year ahead.

Preparing forecasts will help a business to assess its likely sales income, costs, external financing needs and profitability. Financial forecasts are essential if a business needs to raise money from a third party, such as a bank. But they also provide businesses with the means to monitor performance on, say, a monthly basis and thereby exercise effective financial controlarguably the second most important management function in running a business.

Financial management
Financial management refers to the set business processes done to close the financial records of an organization at the end of a period in an accurate and timely fashion according to a generally accepted basis of accounting, including the financial statement presentation of results to both internal and external stakeholders, as well as providing appropriate explanations and insights to the nature of the financial results and all supporting documentation.

Supply chain effectiveness
Supply chain effectiveness refers to capabilities to not only manage an enterprise supply chain, but also to provide transparency to all parts of the value chain. This includes the ability to see the sales pipeline and create demand plans organized with suppliers to fulfil those demand plans. Another area of key focus is sales and operations planning (S&OP).

See also
 Executive information systems

References

Further reading

 Newman, William D., Financial Planning and Analysis Using SAP EPM. 2014 
 Newman, William D., Understanding SAP BusinessObjects Enterprise Performance Management. 2010 
 Bardoliwalla, Nenshad, Buscemi, Stephanie, and Broady, Denise, Driven to Perform. 2011 

Organizational performance management